Draco (Drakōn; fl. c. 7th century BC), also called Drako or Drakon, was the first recorded legislator of Athens in Ancient Greece. He replaced the prevailing system of oral law and blood feud by the Draconian constitution, a written code to be enforced only by a court of law. Draco was the first democratic legislator requested by the Athenian citizens to be a lawgiver for the city-state, but the citizens had not expected that Draco would establish laws characterized by their harshness. 'His name may be a metaphor (δράκων literally means "sharp-sighted"), not the name of an actual person, since there are reasons to believe that he is also a fiction, entirely  or in part. This is supported by the lack of a patronymic and any biographical information.

Since the 19th century, the adjective draconian (Greek: δρακόντειος drakónteios) refers to similarly unforgiving rules or laws, in Greek, English, and other European languages.

 Life 
During the 39th Olympiad, in 622 or 621 BC, Draco established the legal code with which he is identified.

Little is known about Draco’s life. He may have belonged to the Greek nobility of Attica prior to the period of the Seven Sages of Greece, as per the 10th-century Byzantine encyclopedia, the Suda. The Suda chronicles a folkloric story of his death in the Aeginetan theatre: in a traditional ancient Greek show of approval, his supporters "threw so many hats and shirts and cloaks on his head that he suffocated, and was buried in that same theatre". The truth about his death is still unclear, but it is known that Draco was driven out of Athens by the Athenians to the neighbouring island of Aegina, where he spent the remainder of his life.

Draconian constitution

The laws ( – ) that he laid were the first written constitution of Athens. So that no one would be unaware of them, they were posted on wooden tablets ( – ), where they were preserved for almost two centuries on steles of the shape of  four-sided pyramids ( – ). The tablets were called , perhaps because they could be pivoted along the pyramid's axis to read any side.

The constitution featured several major innovations:
Instead of oral laws known to a special class, arbitrarily applied and interpreted, all laws were written, thus being made known to all literate citizens (who could appeal to the Areopagus for injustices): "the constitution formed under Draco, when the first code of laws was drawn up". (Aristotle: Athenian Constitution, Part 5, Section 41)
The laws distinguish between murder and involuntary homicide.

The laws were particularly harsh. For example, any debtor whose status was lower than that of his creditor was forced into slavery. The punishment was more lenient for those owing a debt to a member of a lower class. The death penalty was the punishment for even minor offences, such as stealing a cabbage. Concerning the liberal use of the death penalty in the Draconic code, Plutarch states:

All Draco's laws were repealed by Solon in the early 6th century BC, with the exception of the homicide law.

Homicide law
After much debate, the Athenians decided to revise the laws, including the homicide law, in 409 BC. The homicide law is a highly fragmented inscription, but states that it is up to the victim's relatives to prosecute a killer. According to the preserved part of the inscription, unintentional homicides received a sentence of exile.

It is not clear whether Draco's law specified the punishment for intentional homicide. In 409 BC, intentional homicide was punished by death, but Draco's law begins: 'καὶ ἐὰμ μὲ ‘κ [π]ρονοί[α]ς [κ]τ[ένει τίς τινα, φεύγ]ε[ν]' Although ambiguous and difficult to translate, one suggested translation is: "Even if a man not intentionally kills another, he is exiled."

Council of Four Hundred
Draco introduced the lot-chosen Council of Four Hundred, distinct from the Areopagus, which evolved in later constitutions to play a large role in Athenian democracy. Aristotle notes that Draco, while having the laws written, merely legislated for an existing unwritten Athenian constitution such as setting exact qualifications for eligibility for office.

Draco extended the franchise to all free men who could furnish themselves with a set of military equipment. They elected the Council of Four Hundred from among their number; nine archons and the treasurers were drawn from persons possessing an unencumbered property of not less than ten minas, the generals (strategoi) and commanders of cavalry (hipparchoi) from those who could show an unencumbered property of not less than a hundred minas and had children born in lawful wedlock over ten years of age. Thus, in the event of their death, their estate could pass to a competent heir. These officers were required to hold to account the prytanes (councillors), strategoi (generals) and hipparchoi'' (cavalry officers) of the preceding year until their accounts had been audited. "The Council of Areopagus was guardian of the laws, and kept watch over the magistrates to see that they executed their offices in accordance with the laws. Any person who felt himself wronged might lay an information before the Council of Areopagus, on declaring what law was broken by the wrong done to him. But, as has been said before, loans were secured upon the persons of the debtors, and the land was in the hands of a few."

See also 

 Ancient Greek law
 Hammurabi, a Babylonian who wrote some of the earliest codes of law
 Cruel and unusual punishment
 Retributive justice
 List of Ancient Greeks
 List of eponymous laws (those named after their inventor)

References

Further reading

External links

 Decree to republish Draco’s law on homicide—Translation of original inscription
 

7th-century BC Athenians
Ancient Greek law
Ancient legislators
Archaic Athens
Government of ancient Athens
Year of birth unknown
Year of death unknown